Frith Common is a village in Worcestershire, England.

Frith Common is a village on the north side of the Teme valley, in the parish of Lindridge. It consists of less than sixty houses which encircle a mixed woodland. It has an approximate population of 900

References

External links
 

Villages in Worcestershire